The 1926–27 United States collegiate men's ice hockey season was the 33rd season of collegiate ice hockey in the United States.

Regular season

Standings

References

1926–27 NCAA Standings

External links
College Hockey Historical Archives

1926–27 United States collegiate men's ice hockey season
College